Dunes-de-Berry Ecological Reserve is an ecological reserve of Quebec, Canada. It was established on

References

External links
 Official website from Government of Québec

Protected areas of Abitibi-Témiscamingue
Nature reserves in Quebec
Protected areas established in 1996
1996 establishments in Quebec